Aleksandr Severov (24 February 1889, date of death unknown) was a Russian Empire wrestler. He competed in the middleweight event at the 1912 Summer Olympics.

References

External links
 

1889 births
Year of death missing
Olympic wrestlers from the Russian Empire
Wrestlers at the 1912 Summer Olympics
Male sport wrestlers from the Russian Empire
Sportspeople from Saint Petersburg